Mount Rhondda is located on the Continental Divide straddling the Canadian provinces of Alberta and British Columbia. It was named in 1917 by the Interprovincial Boundary Survey after David Alfred Thomas, First Viscount Baron Rhondda.

First Ascent
Mt. Rhondda was first climbed in August 1923 by A. Geoffrion, J.W.A. Hickson and Edward Feuz Jr. The party's original intent was the FA of Mount Baker but early on in the ascent they discovered tracks from a different party (Walter Wilcox and Rudolf Aemmer) heading towards Mt. Baker. They decided to continue onto the col between the two peaks where they spotted snow tracks and cairn on the summit rocks of Mt. Baker. With Baker claimed, they turned their attention to Mt. Rhondda which they summitted in the early afternoon after ascending mixed terrain of rock and snow.

Geology
Mount Rhondda is composed of sedimentary rock laid down during the Precambrian to Jurassic periods. Formed in shallow seas, this sedimentary rock was pushed east and over the top of younger rock during the Laramide orogeny.

Climate
Based on the Köppen climate classification, Mount Rhondda is located in a subarctic climate with cold, snowy winters, and mild summers. Temperatures can drop below  with wind chill factors below .

See also
 List of peaks on the British Columbia–Alberta border

References

External links
 Mt. Rhondda photo: Flickr

Three-thousanders of Alberta
Three-thousanders of British Columbia
Canadian Rockies